Behjerd-e Bala (also Romanized as Behjerd-e Bālā; also known as Behjerd) is a village in Halil Rural District, in the Central District of Jiroft County, Kerman Province, Iran. At the 2006 census, its population was 39, in 9 families.

References 

Populated places in Jiroft County